Ivan Đurđević (also transliterated Djurdjević; born 5 February 1977) is a Serbian football manager and former player, currently in charge of Polish club Śląsk Wrocław.

He started his career in his native Belgrade before moving to CD Ourense in Galicia. He then spent many years in the top flight in Portugal before moving to Lech Poznań of Poland, finishing his playing career and moving onto a managerial career with them.

Playing career
Born in Belgrade, Socialist Federal Republic of Yugoslavia, Đurđević made his professional debuts with FK Rad in 1996. In January 1998 he first moved abroad, going on to remain two and a half years in Spain with CD Ourense and competing in both the Segunda División and Segunda División B tournaments.

Đurđević spent most of his 17-year career in Portugal, where he amassed Primeira Liga totals of 154 games and 16 goals with S.C. Farense, Vitória S.C. and C.F. Os Belenenses, and in Poland, spending six consecutive seasons in the Ekstraklasa with Lech Poznań.

Coaching career
After retiring, Đurđević stayed connected to his last club as a youth manager. On 8 May 2015, he was appointed head coach of the reserves in III liga. In May 2018, Đurđević became manager of the senior team. He was dismissed on 4 November 2018.

On 20 May 2019, Đurđević was appointed manager of Chrobry Głogów. On 4 May 2022, with three games to go and Chrobry still in contention for promotion, it was announced he would step down from his role at the end of the season. Chrobry entered the promotion play-offs and caused an upset by eliminating Arka Gdynia on 26 May 2022, only to come up short in the final against Korona Kielce three days later.

On 2 June 2022, Đurđević made his return to Ekstraklasa and was announced as the new manager of Śląsk Wrocław.

Managerial statistics

Honours
Lech Poznań
Ekstraklasa: 2009–10
Polish Cup: 2008–09
Polish Super Cup: 2009

References

External links

 
 
 
 
 

1977 births
Living people
Footballers from Belgrade
Serbian footballers
Association football defenders
Association football midfielders
FK Rad players
Segunda División players
Segunda División B players
CD Ourense footballers
Primeira Liga players
S.C. Farense players
Vitória S.C. players
C.F. Os Belenenses players
Ekstraklasa players
Lech Poznań players
Serbian expatriate footballers
Expatriate footballers in Spain
Expatriate footballers in Portugal
Expatriate footballers in Poland
Serbian expatriate sportspeople in Spain
Serbian expatriate sportspeople in Portugal
Serbian expatriate sportspeople in Poland
Serbian football managers
Ekstraklasa managers
I liga managers
Lech Poznań managers
Śląsk Wrocław managers
Serbian expatriate football managers
Expatriate football managers in Poland